The KENI Radio Building is an Art Moderne building in Anchorage, Alaska, designed by architect Augustine A. Porreca and completed in 1948. The building housed KENI AM, the second radio station in Anchorage.

The reinforced concrete two-story building was owned by Cap Lathrop, who had worked with Porreca on Lathrop's Fourth Avenue Theatre. Besides radio station facilities, the building also housed three apartments.

The building was purchased by Gregory Carr in the late 1990s, after the radio station moved to the Dimond Center, and converted into a private residence.

References

External links

1948 establishments in Alaska
Commercial buildings completed in 1948
Commercial buildings on the National Register of Historic Places in Alaska
Historic American Buildings Survey in Alaska
Houses in Anchorage, Alaska
Houses on the National Register of Historic Places in Alaska
Buildings and structures on the National Register of Historic Places in Anchorage, Alaska
+
Streamline Moderne architecture in Alaska
Studios in the United States